The Linebarger House is a historic house at 606 West Central Avenue in Bentonville, Arkansas, U.S.A.  This two-story Craftsman-style house was built in 1920 by C. A. Linebarger, one of the principal developers of the Bella Vista resort area north of Bentonville.  As one of the first Craftsman houses built, it played a significant role in popularizing the style in the region, with a deep porch whose roof is supported by stone porch piers, wide eaves with decorative supporting brackets, and exposed rafter tails.

The house was listed on the National Register of Historic Places in 1988.

See also
National Register of Historic Places listings in Benton County, Arkansas

References

Houses on the National Register of Historic Places in Arkansas
Houses completed in 1920
Houses in Bentonville, Arkansas
National Register of Historic Places in Bentonville, Arkansas
Individually listed contributing properties to historic districts on the National Register in Arkansas
1920 establishments in Arkansas
Bungalow architecture in Arkansas
American Craftsman architecture in Arkansas